Alexander McConnell (1875 – after 1905) was a Scottish professional footballer who played as a full-back.

References

1875 births
Footballers from East Ayrshire
Scottish footballers
Association football fullbacks
Glenbuck Cherrypickers F.C. players
Everton F.C. players
Arsenal F.C. players
Queens Park Rangers F.C. players
Grimsby Town F.C. players
English Football League players
Southern Football League players
Scottish Junior Football Association players
Year of death missing